Ben Barzman (October 12, 1910 – December 15, 1989) was a Canadian journalist, screenwriter, and novelist, blacklisted during the McCarthy Era and best known for his screenplays for the films  Back to Bataan (1945), El Cid (1961), and The Blue Max (1966).

Career
He was born in Toronto, Ontario to a Jewish family.  He was the screenwriter or co-writer of more than 20 films, from You're a Lucky Fellow, Mr. Smith (1943) to The Head of Normande St. Onge (1975).

Blacklisting

Like many of his colleagues in the movie business, Barzman was blacklisted by the House Un-American Activities Committee.

His wife, Norma Barzman, was a Communist Party USA member from 1943 to 1949.  In 2014, she told the Los Angeles Times, "one should be proud to have been a member of the American Communist Party during those years. Hitler was invading the Soviet Union, so there was no reason to be anti-Russian, they were our allies."

The couple moved to England so Barzman could work on the film Give Us This Day (aka, Christ in Concrete, 1949). Following his return to the United States after directing Give Us This Day, Edward Dmytryk, one of the Hollywood Ten, testified about the Barzmans to HUAC in 1951. "To get out of prison he named us and a lot of other people," said Norma Barzman in 2014. In the 1950s, the family moved to Paris, where friends included Pablo Picasso, Yves Montand, and Simone Signoret, and later southern France). Barzman did not receive credit for some films because of the Hollywood Blacklist.

His U.S. citizenship was revoked from 1954 to 1963.  His wife Norma had her passport revoked from 1951 for seven years.  The family remained abroad in London, Paris and Mougins until 1976, during which time he wrote his novels and screenplays for French and Italian films.

Death
Barzman died in Santa Monica, California, United States.

Surviving him was his wife, Norma Barzman, and seven children (including director Paolo Barzman, screenwriter Aaron Barzman, visual artist Luli Barzman, and French university professor John Barzman) and five grandchildren.

Work

Filmography
 1943: You're a Lucky Fellow, Mr. Smith
 1945: Back to Bataan
 1946: Never Say Goodbye
 1948: The Boy with Green Hair
 1949: Give Us This Day
 1952: Stranger on the Prowl (it: Imbarco a mezzanotte) 
 1952: The Faithful City
 1952: Young Man with Ideas
 1955: Oasis
 1957: Time Without Pity
 1957: He Who Must Die (fr: Celui qui doit mourir)
 1959: Blind Date (US: Chance Meeting)
 1961: El Cid
 1963: 55 Days at Peking
 1963: The Ceremony
 1964: The Fall of the Roman Empire
 1964: The Visit
 1965: The Heroes of Telemark
 1966: The Blue Max
 1969: Z—uncredited
 1972: Plot
 1974: The Martyr (ger: Sie sind frei, Doktor Korczak)
 1975: Normande

Bibliography
In 1960, Barzman emerged as a science fiction author, with his novel Out of This World. It dealt with the idea of a twin, parallel planet for Earth in the same orbit, hidden from our view by the sun. The two planets have developed almost identically from creation—but World War II never happens on the twin Earth.

 Out of This World (London: Collins, 1960) - published in the U.S. as Twinkle, Twinkle Little Star (G.P. Putnam's Sons) and subsequently in various paperback editions as Echo X; also published in Sweden as Från en annan värld
 Rich Dreams (Warner Books, 1982) - novel, written with Norma Barzman; published as a paperback original

Awards
 1985:  Order of Arts and Letters

Legacy
In addition to having several children follow him in the Arts, he received a retrospective showing of his films at the Cinematheque in 1982.

References

External sources
 Norma Barzman, The Red and the Blacklist (2003)

Tender Comrades: Interviews with Blacklisted Hollywood Reds

Canadian science fiction writers
Canadian male journalists
Canadian male novelists
1910 births
1989 deaths
Canadian communists
20th-century Canadian novelists
20th-century Canadian screenwriters
Journalists from Toronto
Canadian male screenwriters
Writers from Toronto
Jewish Canadian journalists